C Battery Royal Horse Artillery are a Close Support Battery of 3rd Regiment Royal Horse Artillery currently based in Albemarle Barracks, Northumberland, England

History

19th century
During the Corunna campaign commanded by Capt. Henry Eveleigh, participated in the retreat, but embarked before the battle began.
Half of C Bty was deployed on the Jowaki expedition of 1877–8.

Northern Ireland

C Battery, 3rd Regiment Royal Horse Artillery, was attached to 1st Battalion The Royal Anglian Regiment during an operational tour of Northern Ireland from May until November 1991. The Battalion, and Battery, were on ops in County Fermanagh, mainly operating from St. Angelo Barracks in Eneskillen.

The Battery return to Northern Ireland in October 1992 as part of a Regimental Tour of Armagh with C Battery manning the PVCP at Middletown which was also Battery HQ and Keady RUC Station.  The tour concluded in April 1993.

The Regiment was again deployed to Armagh in October 1996 with C  Battery being selected as the first non-Infantry Ops Company covering most of the province in support of operations. Based at Drammad Barracks in Armagh they covered from South of Londonderry to West of Belfast during what was a busy time for the South Armagh sniper using a variety of armoured land rover, helicopter and foot patrols  The tour concluded in April 1997.

See also

British Army
Royal Artillery
Royal Horse Artillery
List of Royal Artillery Batteries

References

Bibliography

External links
 
 
 

Royal Horse Artillery batteries
Royal Artillery batteries
British military units and formations of the Crimean War
1793 establishments in Great Britain
Military units and formations established in 1793